Odd Rode is a civil parish in Cheshire East, England. It contains 35 buildings that are recorded in the National Heritage List for England as designated listed buildings.  Of these, one is listed at Grade I, the highest grade, five are listed at Grade II*, the middle grade, and the others are at Grade II.  The most important listed building in the parish is Little Moreton Hall; other notable country houses include Rode Hall and Ramsdell Hall.  Most of the other listed buildings are houses, farmhouses, and associated structures.  The Macclesfield and the Trent and Mersey Canals run through the parish, and the listed buildings associated with these are bridges, milestones, and distance markers.  The other listed buildings are a church. a folly, wellheads, and a public house.

Key

Buildings

Listed buildings

Buildings of local architectural interest
Although the following buildings are not on the Register, in 2011 as part of the Odd Rode Village Design Statement they were deemed to be of local architectural interest.

Rode Heath

Scholar Green

References

Citations

Sources

Listed buildings in the Borough of Cheshire East
Lists of listed buildings in Cheshire